U.S. Bus Corporation of Suffern, New York was a manufacturer of small and mid-sized school buses and non-school buses, such as those used by churches and day care centers. U.S. Bus became Trans Tech in November 2007.

Products

See also
 Trans Tech - successor company

References

External links
 US Bus Corp (Archive)

U.S. Bus Corporation
U.S. Bus Corporation
Companies based in Rockland County, New York